Siedlice may refer to the following places in Poland:
Siedlice, Opole Voivodeship (south-west Poland)
Siedlice, Łobez County in West Pomeranian Voivodeship (north-west Poland)
Siedlice, Police County in West Pomeranian Voivodeship (north-west Poland)
Siedlice, Szczecinek County in West Pomeranian Voivodeship (north-west Poland)

See also
Siedlce